The 2012 Allan Cup was the Canadian championship of senior ice hockey and was the 104th year the Allan Cup was awarded.  It was contended in Lloydminster, Saskatchewan from April 16 to April 21, 2012 and hosted by the Lloydminster Border Kings of the Saskatchewan Hockey Association.  The South East Prairie Thunder of Manitoba defeated the Rosetown Red Wings of Saskatchewan to win their first national championship.  The Thunder were runners up in 2009.

Participants
Lloydminster Border Kings (Host)
Kenora Thistles (Central)
Defeated Dundas Real McCoys 2-games-to-none (Renwick Cup) to earn berth
Grand Falls-Windsor Cataracts (Atlantic)
Won 2011 Herder Memorial Trophy to earn berth
South East Prairie Thunder (Manitoba)
Defeated Manitoba Lightning 4-games-to-none (Pattison Cup) to earn berth
Stony Plain Eagles (Pacific)
Defeated Powell River Regals 3-games-to-1 (McKenzie Cup) to earn berth
Rosetown Red Wings (Saskatchewan)
Defeated Balgonie Bisons 3-games-to-2 to gain berth

Round robin

Results

Championship Round

Quarter and Semi-finals

Final

Awards
Bill Saunders Award (Tournament MVP): Devon Leblanc (South East Prairie Thunder)
All Star Team
Goalie: Justin Harris (South East Prairie Thunder) 
Defense: Dallas Fallscheer (Lloydminster Border Kings)
Defense: Shawn Germain (Rosetown Red Wings)
Forward: Devon Leblanc (South East Prairie Thunder)
Forward: Jonathan Poirier (Kenora Thistles)
Forward: Carter Smith (Rosetown Red Wings)

References

External links
Official Allan Cup Site 

2012 Allan Cup
2012
Sport in Lloydminster
2011–12 in Canadian ice hockey